HMAS Tobruk (D37) was a  of the Royal Australian Navy (RAN). Built at the Cockatoo Island Dockyard, the destroyer was completed in 1950. Tobruk was deployed to the Korean War twice, and served with the Far East Strategic Reserve on three occasions during the late 1950s. In 1960, she was damaged beyond economical repair by sister ship  during a gunnery exercise, which led to the destroyer's decommissioning that year, and sale for scrap in 1971.

Design and construction

Tobruk was a Battle-class destroyer. The ship had a standard load displacement of 2,436 tons and a full load displacement of 3,400 tons. Propulsion machinery consisted of Admiralty 3-drum boilers connected to Parsons geared turbines, which supplied  to the ship's two propeller shafts. The ship's company consisted of 19 officers and 301 sailors.

Tobruks primary armament consisted of four  Mark III guns, fitted forward in two twin turrets. For anti-aircraft defence, the ship carried twelve 40 mm Bofors anti-aircraft guns: three twin mountings on the aft half of the ship, and six single mountings. Two five-tube Pentad torpedo tube sets were carried. Tobruk was also fitted with a Squid anti-submarine mortar.

The ship was laid down by the Cockatoo Docks and Engineering Company at their shipyard on Cockatoo Island, New South Wales on 5 August 1946. Tobruk was launched on 20 December 1947 by the wife of Bill Riordan, Minister for the Navy. The destroyer was commissioned into the RAN on 8 May 1950, although she was not completed until 17 May. The ship's name comes from the Siege of Tobruk.

Operational history
After completing trials and workups, Tobruk was deployed to the Korean War in August 1951. Between October 1951 and January 1952, the destroyer carried out six patrols, primarily serving as an aircraft carrier escort, or performing shore bombardments. Tobruk returned to Australia in February 1952. In October, she was part of the security patrol around the Montebello Islands during Operation Hurricane, the first British nuclear weapons test. In June 1953, Tobruk returned to Korea for a second deployment. Although a ceasefire was signed in July 1953, Tobruk remained in the area until January 1954, then returned to Australia for a refit. Tobruk received the battle honour "Korea 1951–53" for these deployments.

After completing refit, Tobruk operated in the waters of Australia and New Guinea until mid 1955, when she joined several RAN ships in a deployment to South East Asia. In 1956, she was assigned to the Far East Strategic Reserve. A further deployment was made in 1957, during which Tobruk was involved in the Malayan Emergency; this was later recognised with a second battle honour: "Malaya 1957". On 26 April, during night exercises, a star shell fired by  landed in one of Tobruks gun bays, killing one sailor and severely wounding another. The destroyer's third and final assignment to the Strategic Reserve occurred during 1959. After a refit during early 1960, Tobruk and several other RAN ships made port visits to Nouméa and New Guinea.

Fate
A malfunction in Anzacs gun direction equipment negated the deliberate 6° mis-aiming of her guns, with the resulting shell hitting Tobruk and doing enough damage to the destroyer to require lengthy repairs. Temporary repairs were made to Tobruk in Jervis Bay before the ship limped back to Sydney, where she was placed into reserve on 29 October 1960. Two of Anzacs crew were charged over the incident.

Repairing the destroyer was considered uneconomical, and she remained moored until the ship was marked for disposal on 14 May 1971. Tobruk was sold for scrap to Fujita Salvage Company Limited of Osaka, Japan on 15 February 1972, and departed Sydney under tow on 10 April 1972.

Citations

References

Further reading

Battle-class destroyers of the Royal Australian Navy
Ships built in New South Wales
1947 ships
Korean War destroyers of Australia